The 1997–98 Scottish Premier Division season was the last season of Scottish Football League Premier Division football before the change to the Scottish Premier League. It began on 1 August 1997.

Overview
The 1997–98 Scottish Premier Division season ended in success for Celtic who won by two points from nearest rivals Rangers, beating St Johnstone on the last day to clinch the title. Claiming the trophy would have given Rangers a record-breaking 10 Scottish League Championships in a row (having matched Celtic's record the previous season). Heart of Midlothian ran Celtic and Rangers very close to winning the title, and led for large spells of the season before falling away towards the end of the season. Hibernian were relegated to the First Division after finishing bottom. As champions, Celtic qualified for the Champions League while Rangers were joined by Kilmarnock in qualifying for the UEFA Cup. Third-placed Heart of Midlothian qualified for the last Cup Winners' Cup as Scottish Cup winners.

Rangers were involved in some of the season's big transfers with Lorenzo Amoruso and Marco Negri arriving in multimillion-pound deals. Paul Gascoigne also left the club, heading for Middlesbrough in a £3.5m deal. Negri went on to become only the second player to score five goals in a Scottish Premier Division match, equalling Paul Sturrock's record by netting all five goals in a 5–1 win over Dundee United.

The season began on 2 August with the first goal of the season scored by Dundee United's Kjell Olofsson as they drew 1–1 at newly promoted St Johnstone. The season ended on 9 May with Hibernian's Stevie Crawford netting a last-minute equaliser away to Kilmarnock to score the final goal of the season.

Clubs

Promotion and relegation from 1996–97
Promoted from First Division to Premier League
St Johnstone

Relegated from Premier Division to First Division
Raith Rovers

Stadia and locations

Managers

Managerial changes

Events
 23 August: Marco Negri equals Paul Sturrock's record with five goals in one match in the 5–1 win over Dundee United
 September: Darren Jackson undergoes surgery for hydrocephalus, returning to action within three months
 9 May: Celtic win the title after a 2–0 home win over St Johnstone F.C

League table

Results

Matches 1–18
During matches 1–18 each team plays every other team twice (home and away).

Matches 19–36
During matches 19–36 each team plays every other team a further two times (home and away).

Top scorers

Source: Soccerbot

References

Scottish Premier Division seasons
Scot
1997–98 Scottish Football League